Whovians is an Australian comedy panel chat show hosted by Rove McManus, which screens on ABC. Rove engages with a team of four celebrity "Whovians", that is fans of science fiction television series Doctor Who, to analyse, critique and unravel the mysteries of the program. The first episode screened on 16 April 2017 on ABC TV Plus as a companion piece to the first episode of the tenth series of Doctor Who after it aired on ABC. The second season began 8 October 2018 on ABC TV Plus as a companion piece to the first episode of the eleventh series.

The show regularly features fans such as Tegan Higginbotham, Adam Richard, Steven "Bajo" O'Donnell and Justin Hamilton. Guest fans have included Geraldine Quinn, Jordan Raskopoulos, Stephen Conroy, Alice Fraser, Petra Elliott, Rhianna Patrick, Yassmin Abdel-Magied, Tasma Walton, Paul Verhoeven, Bridie Connell, Celia Pacquola, Dave Callan, Cal Wilson and Stewart "Stav" Davidson.

Regular segments
Each season includes a number of regular opinion pieces, comedy segments and video packages.  These have included:
 He Who Knows Who News - presented by Justin Hamilton (season 1)
 Thirteenth Doctor Auditions by ABC Celebrities (season 1)
 The Vault (season 1)
 The Moment (seasons 2 & 3)
 This Week In Who-story (season 3)
 WHOse Show (season 3)
 Rove talks candidly to Doctor Who characters (season 3)

Episode list

Episodes

Season 1 (2017)

 Note: Italicized names are guests to the panel.

Season 2 (2018)

Season 3 (2020) 

On December 17, 2019, ABC Comedy announced that Whovians would be back following part two of the New Years Special.

2021 
On December 30, 2020, Rove McManus hinted on Twitter that Whovians would be returning for a fourth season in 2021.

However Whovians didn't return to ABC TV due to the COVID-19 pandemic.

Instead the Newcastle Local Group from the Doctor Who Club of Australia organised a panel from the Whovians team running on Zoom to discuss each episode of Doctor Who: Flux which aired on ABC TV in late 2021.

Reception
The Sydney Morning Herald said that "Rove McManus' dissection [of each episode of Dr Who] afterwards is a fun and factoid-filled debrief."

References

External links
 

2017 Australian television series debuts
Australian Broadcasting Corporation original programming
Australian comedy television series
English-language television shows
Television series about television
Works about Doctor Who